PMOF may refer to:
Presidential Medal of Freedom
Premature Ovarian Failure (gynecology), also called Primary ovarian insufficiency
Project Management Organization Framework (Project portfolio management)
Post-Traumatic Multiple Organ Failure (Multiple organ dysfunction syndrome)
Persistent Memory over Fabrics (PMoF)